A supper club is a traditional dining establishment that also functions as a social club. The term may describe different establishments depending on the region, but in general, supper clubs tend to present themselves as having a high-class image, even if the price is affordable to all. A newer usage of the term supper club has emerged, referring to underground restaurants.

Other names
Supper clubs, when used in the newer context of underground restaurants, are also known as home bistros, guerrilla diners, secret restaurants, paladares, puertas cerradas, pop-up restaurants, guestaurants, speakeasies, and anti-restaurants.

In antiquity
Supper clubs were common in the Roman Empire. One of the most notable clubs was that of Mithraism. These clubs often spanned social classes but primarily served all-male members. Supper Clubs served an important role in the division of labor, especially within in the Roman imperial administration and military. By pooling and specializing resources needed for basic nourishment, Rome was able to gain a productivity advantage over its neighbors and subjected peoples.

In the United States

In the U.S., a supper club is a dining establishment generally found across the United States, but currently concentrated in the Upper Midwestern states of Wisconsin, Minnesota, Michigan, Illinois and Iowa. These establishments typically are located on the edge of town in rural areas.

History
The first supper club in the United States was established in Beverly Hills, California, by Milwaukee, Wisconsin native Lawrence Frank. Supper clubs became popular during the 1930s and 1940s, although some establishments that later became supper clubs had previously gained notoriety as prohibition roadhouses. 

Traditionally, supper clubs were considered a "destination" where patrons would spend the whole evening, from cocktail hour to nightclub-style entertainment after dinner. Featuring a casual and relaxed atmosphere, they are now usually just restaurants rather than the all-night entertainment destinations of the past.

Typical menu
Supper clubs generally feature simple menus with somewhat limited offerings featuring typical American cuisine. Dishes may include prime rib, steaks, chicken, and fish. An all-you-can-eat Friday night fish fry is particularly common at Wisconsin supper clubs. Relish trays with items such as crackers, carrots, green onions, pickles, radishes, and celery are typically served at the table on Lazy Susans.

In the United Kingdom

Supper clubs in the UK adopted the cabaret concept of the American 1930s and 1940s and aimed to bring the ambience of the underground New York jazz club to the UK entertainment scene, where people could enjoy a dinner without the formality of a ball, whilst enjoying live music. These clubs were often the centre of social networks in both rural communities and cities. Traditional supper club menus consisted of standard American fare, and in the UK there was a concerted drive to give the food and wine a British twist. Some supper clubs were purely informal dining societies whilst others incorporated musical acts to complement the atmosphere. There was also a form of supper club which acted as an informal dating platform. Both have largely been replaced by modern nightclubs.

The term "supper club" is enjoying a revival with slightly different meaning – generally a small underground club (often with roving premises which are only revealed to the guests when they buy a ticket), where guests eat from a restricted or set menu, and are expected to fraternise with other guests whom they may not know.

In the 2020s in the UK 'underground restaurants' and 'supper clubs'  started to blossom, with reviews in leading newspapers such as The Times and The Guardian. They range across the UK but are mainly concentrated in London. These are advertised by word of mouth and on social media networks such as Twitter and Facebook. There are a number of ways to find out about supper clubs including social media and the website Eat My World, which lists events all over the UK. Some supper clubs in London are advertised on Grub Club, a London online supperclub platform.

In Latin America
In Latin America, a supper club is typically an underground restaurant known as either a paladar or a restaurante de puertas cerradas (locked door restaurant). Although technically illegal, this type of restaurant is built into the culture, often with higher standards than many licensed establishments. They are becoming increasingly popular in the U.S.

The attraction of the underground restaurant for the customer is the ability to sample new food at low prices outside the traditional restaurant experience. For the host, benefits are making some money and experimenting with cooking without having to invest in a restaurant proper.  As one host told the San Francisco Chronicle, "It's literally like playing restaurant... You can create the event, and then it's over."

See also
 Dining club
 List of supper clubs
 Song and supper room

References

External links
 Mount, Ian. Buenos Aires: Psst! Want a Discreet Dinner?, The New York Times, December 17, 2006.
 Williams, Zoe. The secret feast, The Guardian, February 10, 2009.
 Fairfax The Age article on underground restaurants
 Omidi, Maryam. Top table: Moscow’s fine dining supper club is now serving, The Calvert Journal, February 6, 2013.

Restaurants by type
Wisconsin culture